Tadele Mengesha is an Ethiopian professional footballer, who plays as a midfielder for Sebeta City.

International career
In January 2014, coach Sewnet Bishaw, invited him to be a part of the Ethiopia squad for the 2014 African Nations Championship. The team was eliminated in the group stages after losing to Congo, Libya and Ghana.

References

Living people
Ethiopian footballers
Ethiopia A' international footballers
2014 African Nations Championship players
1987 births
Association football midfielders
Ethiopia international footballers
Arba Minch City F.C. players